Intercity or Inter-city may refer to:

Inter-city rail services
InterCity, a general term for certain long-distance passenger services throughout Europe
InterCity (British Rail), a brand used by British Rail
The Inter-City, an express passenger train serving Britain starting in 1950
InterCity 125, high-speed rail serving Britain starting in 1976 
InterCity 225, high-speed rail serving Britain starting in 1990
InterCity 250, a cancelled project in Britain
InterCity (Iarnród Éireann), serving the Republic of Ireland
Intercity (Deutsche Bahn), serving Germany
Intercity-Express, high-speed rail serving Germany and its surrounding countries 
PKP Intercity, serving Poland
NSB InterCity Express, serving Norway
Intercity Express (Indian Railways), multiple routes called "Intercity Express"
High-speed rail in China, multiple routes called "Intercity Railway"
Metropolitan Intercity Railway Company, serving Japan starting in 1991
KTM Intercity, serving Peninsular Malaysia, Singapore and Thailand
Train types
InterCity Express (Queensland Rail), used in Australia
NS Intercity Materieel, used in The Netherlands
Intercity bus services
Inter-City Bus Terminal, a bus station in Reading, Pennsylvania, USA
InterCity (New Zealand)
Ventura Intercity Service Transit Authority, serving California, USA
Companies, organisations or services with "Intercity" or "Inter-city" in their name
CF Intercity, a Spanish football club
Dublin and Belfast Inter-City Cup, a soccer competition in Ireland 
Intercity baseball tournament, in Japan
Intercity Bridge, in Minnesota, USA
Inter-Cities Fairs Cup, a European football competition
Inter City Firm, an English football hooligan firm
Intercity Football League, in Taiwan
Intercity Golden Gloves, amateur boxing tournament 
Inter-City League, ice hockey league in England
Intercity Shopping Centre, Ontario, Canada
Intercity Viaduct, bridge over the Kansas River, USA